Ancistrus bodenhameri is a species of catfish in the family Loricariidae. It is native to South America, where it occurs in tributaries of Lake Maracaibo in Venezuela. The species reaches 11.4 cm (4.5 inches) SL.

References 

bodenhameri
Fish described in 1944